Sol Hasbrouck (May 28, 1833 – September 7, 1906) was an American politician who served briefly as mayor of Boise, Idaho Territory, in 1885.

Sol was born Solomon Hasbrouck on May 30, 1833 in New Paltz, New York, the son of Alexander (1809-1895) and Rachel Elting Hasbrouck (1813-1839). He was a descendant of 7 of the 12 New Paltz patentees, or founders, including Louis DuBois, and is a member of the Hasbrouck family.

His parents had married on September 1, 1832. Following his mother's passing in 1839, his father re-married on June 5, 1841, to his cousin, Gertrude Bruyn LeFevre (1814-1841). Following her death, his father married for a third time, to Margaret DuBois (1802-1867) on August 5, 1843. Sol had a biological sister, Harriet Hasbrouck Elting (1836-1886), and a half-brother, George DuBois Hasbrouck (b. 1845).

His paternal grandfather, Solomon P. Hasbrouck, served as town supervisor of New Paltz in 1839.

On August 22, 1867 in New Paltz, Sol married Anne Eliza Van Wagenen (1837-1907), daughter of Benjamin and Catharine (DuBois) Van Wagenen. They were fourth cousins through the LeFevre family. She was also the niece of Sol's step-mother, Margaret. 
They had at least four children, including:
 Edward Halleck “Ned” Hasbrouck (October 18, 1869 – December 28, 1938); married Bessie Evelyn Eldred on November 5, 1902- two children, Mary Elizabeth and Sol Hasbrouck.
 Raymond Delancey Hasbrouck (July 20, 1871 – March 19, 1926); married Olive Scott Halladay on January 22, 1902; two sons, Jan and David Hasbrouck.
 Elizabeth Miller Hasbrouck (March 28, 1873 – April 12, 1946); married Charles Douglass Shrady on April 27, 1898- one son, Raymond Delancey Shrady.
 Van Wagenen Hasbrouck (September 21, 1876 – October 28, 1918), who married Ladie Larguerite Pingree (1884-1966). Their daughter was film actress Olive Hasbrouck.

At the time of the 1870 and 1880 United States Census, Sol was living in Boise.

Hasbrouck won the 1885 mayoral election, but resigned four months into his term when he moved his business outside city limits. He was succeeded by James W. Huston.

Following his death in Boise, he was buried in the Pioneer Cemetery there.

References

Sources
Mayors of Boise - Past and Present
Idaho State Historical Society Reference Series, Corrected List of Mayors, 1867-1996

Mayors of Boise, Idaho
1833 births
1906 deaths